Naimark is a surname. Notable persons with the surname include:
 Arnold Naimark, Canadian physician, academic and university administrator
 Mark Naimark, Soviet mathematician
 Michael Naimark, American media artist
 Norman Naimark, American historian

See also
 Naimark's problem, a question in the field of functional analysis
 Naimark's dilation theorem
 Gelfand–Naimark theorem
 Gelfand–Naimark–Segal construction
 Neumark (surname)